United Nations Security Council resolution 996, adopted unanimously on 30 May 1995, after considering a report by the Secretary-General Boutros Boutros-Ghali regarding the United Nations Disengagement Observer Force (UNDOF), the Council noted its efforts to establish a durable and just peace in the Middle East.

The resolution decided to call upon the parties concerned to immediately implement Resolution 338 (1973), it renewed the mandate of the Observer Force for another six months until 30 November 1995 and requested that the Secretary-General submit a report on the situation at the end of that period.

See also
 Arab–Israeli conflict
 Golan Heights
 Israel–Syria relations
 List of United Nations Security Council Resolutions 901 to 1000 (1994–1995)

References

External links
 
Text of the Resolution at undocs.org

 0996
 0996
1995 in Israel
1995 in Syria
 0996
May 1995 events